Salla Willk'i Punta (Aymara salla rocks, cliffs, willk'i gap, also spelled Salla Willkhi Punta) is a mountain in the Bolivian Andes which reaches a height of approximately . It is located in the Cochabamba Department, Ayopaya Province, Morochata Municipality. It lies north of the lakes named Q'umir Qucha ("green lake", Khomer Khocha), Yana Qucha ("black lake", Yana Khocha), Parinani ("the one with flamingos") and  Wallatani ("the one with Andean geese", Huallatani).

References 

Mountains of Cochabamba Department